is the seventh studio album by Japanese singer Yōko Oginome. Released through Victor Entertainment on August 24, 1988, the album features the hit singles "Stranger Tonight", "Stardust Dream" and "Dear (Cobalt no Kanata e)", the first two having hit No. 1. It was reissued on April 21, 2010, with five bonus tracks as part of Oginome's 25th anniversary celebration.

The album hit No. 1 on Oricon's albums chart and sold over 175,000 copies.

Track listing

Charts
Weekly charts

Year-end charts

References

External links
 
 
 

1988 albums
Yōko Oginome albums
Japanese-language albums
Victor Entertainment albums

ja:CD-RIDER